Augustine Justine is a Papua New Guinean rugby league footballer who represented Papua New Guinea national rugby league team in the 2000 World Cup.

Justine played for the Lae Bombers in the SP Cup.

References

Living people
Papua New Guinean rugby league players
Papua New Guinea national rugby league team players
Rugby league fullbacks
Lae Bombers players
Year of birth missing (living people)